This is a list of cities in Turkmenistan. For a full list of settlements see the list of cities, towns and villages in Turkmenistan.

Which municipalities are categorized as "cities" is established by law in Turkmenistan. Cities fall into three categories: one city equivalent to a province (the capital city, Ashgabat), cities "equivalent to a district", and cities "in a district". By law cities equivalent to a district must have a population of more than 30,000 and must be either a provincial capital or be one of the economic, cultural and administrative centers in its province. Cities "in a district" are subordinated to the district (etrap) government and are administered jointly.  By law they must have a population of more than 8,000, and must possess industrial enterprises, construction and transport organizations, utilities, municipally owned housing stock, socio-cultural institutions, trade and social services. The government maintains a list of municipalities broken out by category, but publishes this list irregularly, and does not post it online. An authoritative list of Turkmenistan's municipalities based on published official Turkmen decrees and laws is on the OpenStreetMap wiki. The most recent published version of the list was released in 2012.

Districts and cities with district status are headed by a presidentially appointed häkim (district governor or city mayor). Two cities in Turkmenistan, Ashgabat and Turkmenbashy, are further subdivided into boroughs with district status, each with its häkim.  Cities "in a district" and towns are headed by an elected council chaired by an arçyn, who serves as both council chair and mayor.

List

Municipalities designated as cities

Unless otherwise annotated, population figures are as of 2010 (estimate).  Provincial capitals are bolded. Cities with district status are italicized.

Changes in 2022
The former cities of Gumdag and Hazar were downgraded to town status in November 2022, and thus have been removed from this list. The cities previously named Gurbansoltan Eje adyndaky, Nyýazow, and Serdar were renamed Andalyp, Shabat, and Gyzylarbat, respectively. The new city of Arkadag was formally incorporated on 20 December 2022 by act of the Turkmen parliament.

See also
Districts of Turkmenistan
List of renamed cities in Turkmenistan
List of cities, towns and villages in Turkmenistan
OpenStreetMap: Turkmenistan Geoname Changes
OpenStreetMap: Districts in Turkmenistan (authoritative list of all municipal structures as of 5 January 2018)

Notes and references

External links

 
Cities
Turkmenistan, List of cities in